Hsi Hseng or Hsi-hseng is a town in the Shan State of eastern Burma. It is located in Hsi Hseng Township in Taunggyi District and lies along National Highway 5. It is connected to Loisawn in the north and Tongkaw in the south. The area is a known producer of opium and methamphetamine; poppy fields and a methamphetamine factory have been reported in Hsi Hseng. Gee Dong was killed near Hsi Hseng in 1974.
 Although sources differ, Hsi Hseng is also considered to be the town where Pa'O musician Khun Thar Doon was murdered in 1978 by Pa'O communists.

References

External links
Satellite map at Maplandia.com

Populated places in Taunggyi District
Township capitals of Myanmar
Hsi Hseng Township